Edera Cordiale (married name Gentile; 30 January 1920 – 4 April 1993) was an Italian athlete who competed mainly in discus throw events.

Biography
She competed for Italy in the 1948 Summer Olympics held in London, United Kingdom in the Discus where she won the Silver medal splitting the French athletes Micheline Ostermeyer and Jacqueline Mazéas. In 1950 in the European Championships she won the bronze medal.

Achievements

National titles
She won 8 times the individual national championship.
8 wins in the discus throw (1943, 1946, 1947, 1948, 1949, 1950, 1951, 1952)

References

External links
 
 
 
 

1920 births
1993 deaths
Sportspeople from Turin
Italian female discus throwers
Athletes (track and field) at the 1948 Summer Olympics
Athletes (track and field) at the 1952 Summer Olympics
Olympic athletes of Italy
Olympic silver medalists for Italy
European Athletics Championships medalists
Medalists at the 1948 Summer Olympics
Olympic silver medalists in athletics (track and field)